The 5. Liga is the fifth-tier football league of Slovakia. It currently consists of 16 groups.

Bratislava region:
 Oblastný futbalový zväz Bratislava-mesto – V. liga
 Oblastný futbalový zväz Bratislava-vidiek – V. liga

ZsFZ:
 V. liga Juh
 V. liga Stred
 V. liga Východ
 V. liga Sever
 V. liga Západ

SsFZ:
 V.liga skupina A
 V.liga skupina B
 V.liga skupina C
 V.liga skupina D

VsFZ:
 V. liga Košicko-gemerská
 V. liga Zemplínska
 V. liga Vihorlatsko-Dukelská
 V. liga Šarišská
 V. liga Podtatranská

References

5
Slovakia
Professional sports leagues in Slovakia